Old Salem Church and Cemetery is a historic Lutheran Church and adjacent cemetery located at Catonsville, Baltimore County, Maryland. The main part of the 1849 Gothic Revival church building is a three bay, irregular stone structure approximately 28 feet wide and 42 feet long. It features a gable roof, a short boxy steeple, an entrance porch at the front and an apse at the rear.  The interior features a gallery and organ loft has the original tracker organ, which is still hand pumped by a wooden lever on the north side of the case. From early on, the ground to the south of the church was laid out as a cemetery. The church was founded by German Lutheran immigrants.

It was listed on the National Register of Historic Places in 1977.

References

External links
 
 
 , including photo from 1997, at Maryland Historical Trust

Catonsville, Maryland
Churches in Baltimore County, Maryland
German-American culture in Maryland
Lutheran churches in Maryland
Churches on the National Register of Historic Places in Maryland
Churches completed in 1849
19th-century Lutheran churches in the United States
1849 establishments in Maryland
National Register of Historic Places in Baltimore County, Maryland
Lutheran cemeteries in the United States